Alfred Andrew Schlert (born July 24, 1961) is an American prelate of the Roman Catholic Church who has been serving as the bishop of the Diocese of Allentown in Pennsylvania since 2017.

Biography

Early life and education
Alfred Schlert was born on July 24, 1961,  in Easton, Pennsylvania, the son of Alfred and Marylou Schlert. He attended St. Jane Frances de Chantal Elementary School and Notre Dame High School, both in Easton. His ecclesiastical studies were undertaken at St. Charles Borromeo Seminary in Philadelphia, the Pontifical Roman Major Seminary in Rome and the Pontifical Lateran University in Rome.

Priesthood 
Schlert was ordained a priest on September 19, 1987, at the Cathedral of Saint Catharine of Siena in Allentown, Pennsylvania, on September 19, 1987, by Bishop Thomas J. Welsh.  After his ordination, Schlert  served as an assistant pastor at St. Francis of Assisi Parish in Allentown, as a professor at Notre Dame High School, and as a chaplain at Lehigh University in Bethlehem. He then completed graduate studies at the Pontifical Lateran University, where he received a Licentiate in Canon Law in 1992.

In 1997, Schlert was named vice chancellor and secretary to Bishop Welsh. In 1998, Bishop Edward P. Cullen appointed Schlert as vicar general, overseeing the coordination of all administrative offices of the diocese. Pope John Paul II named him chaplain to his holiness with the title of monsignor in 1999. Pope Benedict XVI named Schlert a prelate of honor, the second highest rank of monsignor, in 2005. In addition to his administrative responsibilities, in 2008 he became pastor of St. Theresa of the Child Jesus Parish in Hellertown, Pennsylvania.

Bishop of Allentown 
Pope Francis appointed Schlert as bishop for the Diocese of Allentown on June 27, 2017. His consecration by Archbishop Charles Chaput took place on August 31, 2017. In a grand jury report released by Pennsylvania Attorney General Josh Shapiro on August 14, 2018. Lehigh Valley Live noted: According to the grand jury report, Monsignor William Jones was accused of sexually abusing a boy. Two days after the boy reported the abuse, Schlert and Monsignor John B. McCann confronted Jones who "offered his resignation and was advised he could not exercise any public ministry in the diocese or elsewhere." Also according to the report, in 2007 the diocese heard about a boy who was allegedly given alcohol and inappropriately touched by Father Joseph Galko. Monsignor Gerald Gobitas and Schlert confronted Galko, who admitted the allegation. "The diocese laicized Galko and he was eventually dismissed from the priesthood,".

In August 2018, Schlert issued a public apology "for the past sins and crimes committed by some members of the clergy." Shapiro has strongly criticized Schlert for what he perceives as the Bishop's actions when he was a Monsignor. However, some of the public feel that these attacks are in the least unwarranted and unfair.

See also

 Catholic Church hierarchy
 Catholic Church in the United States
 Historical list of the Catholic bishops of the United States
 List of Catholic bishops of the United States
 Lists of patriarchs, archbishops, and bishops

References

External links
Roman Catholic Diocese of  Allentown Official Site

1961 births
Living people
21st-century Roman Catholic bishops in the United States
Bishops appointed by Pope Francis
Catholics from Pennsylvania
Notre Dame High School (Easton, Pennsylvania) alumni
People from Easton, Pennsylvania
Religious leaders from Pennsylvania
Roman Catholic Diocese of Allentown